2020 in Bellator MMA was the twelfth year in the history of Bellator MMA, a mixed martial arts promotion based in the United States. Bellator held 18 events in 2020.

Background
Because of the COVID-19 pandemic in the United States, Bellator would go on hiatus after its 240th numbered event on February 22, 2020. The promotion would resume holding events with Bellator 242 on July 24.

On September 11, 2020, it was announced that Bellator telecasts would move to CBS Sports Network, starting October 1, after Viacom's re-merger with CBS Corporation in 2019. Prior to the announcement, CBS Sports Network debuted the recap series Bellator MMA: Recharged on April 25, 2020.

Bellator 248, which was held on October 10, would be the first MMA event to be held by a major promotion in France since the sport was legalized in January.

Bellator Featherweight World Grand Prix Tournament

Bellator 238

Bellator 238: Budd vs. Cyborg took place on January 25, 2020 at The Forum in Inglewood, California. The event aired live on DAZN.

Background

The event featured a Bellator Women's Featherweight World Championship bout between the champion Julia Budd and former Strikeforce, Invicta, and UFC champion Cris Cyborg.

Results

Bellator 239

Bellator 239: Ruth vs. Amosov took place on February 21, 2020 at WinStar World Casino in Thackerville, Oklahoma.

The event aired live on Paramount Network and DAZN.

The event featured a welterweight bout between Ed Ruth and undefeated Yaroslav Amosov.

Results

Bellator 240

Bellator Dublin/Bellator 240 took place on February 22, 2020 at 3Arena in Dublin, Ireland.

Background

This was the first event of the second year of the Bellator European Series. The event was to be headlined by a bantamweight bout between James Gallagher and Cal Ellenor. However, on February 4, it was announced that Gallagher pulled out of the event due to a back injury, thus a women's featherweight bout between Leah McCourt and Judith Ruis was bumped to the main event.

The fights billed as Bellator 240 will be held on tape-delay on Paramount Network and DAZN and will feature a lightweight bout between former Bellator Lightweight World Champion Brent Primus and Peter Queally. However, Queally pulled out due to injury. Primus instead fought Chris Bungard.

Results

Bellator 241 (Cancelled)

Bellator 241: Pitbull vs. Carvalho was a scheduled event to take place on March 13, 2020 at Mohegan Sun Casino in Uncasville, Connecticut. The event was scheduled to be live on DAZN.

Background

The event was expected to feature a Bellator Featherweight World Championship bout between the champion Patrício Freire and Pedro Carvalho.

A heavyweight between former UFC Heavyweight Champion Josh Barnett and Ronny Markes was expected for the event. The original meeting was scheduled for Bellator 235, but Barnett was pulled out an hour before the fight due to illness and the fight was rebooked for this event. Reports came out stating that Barnett was pulled due to a failed drug test, but Mike Mazzulli, head of the Mohegan Tribe Athletic Department, announced that the reports were false. However on March 4, it was announced that Barnett was officially off the card, which Mazzulli announced that a failed medical test was the reason for Barnett's removal and Bellator then announced that Matt Mitrione would replace Barnett against Markes.

On March 13, the day of the event, Bellator President Scott Coker announced that the event would be cancelled due to the COVID-19 pandemic in the United States.

Cancelled Fight card

Bellator 242 (Cancelled)

Bellator 242: Bader vs. Nemkov was a scheduled event to take place on May 9, 2020 at SAP Center in San Jose, California. The event was scheduled to be live on Paramount Network and DAZN.

Background

The event was expected to feature a Bellator Light Heavyweight World Championship bout between the champion Ryan Bader and Vadim Nemkov.

On March 30, Bellator announced that the event would be cancelled due to the COVID-19 pandemic in the United States.

Cancelled Fight card

Bellator London 3 (Cancelled)

Bellator London: Gallagher vs. Ellenor was a scheduled event to take place on May 16, 2020 at SSE Arena in London, England as part of the Bellator European Fight Series. The event was scheduled to be live on Channel 5.

Background

The event was expected to feature a bantamweight bout between rivals James Gallagher and Cal Ellenor.

On March 30, Bellator announced that the event would be cancelled due to the COVID-19 pandemic in the United States.

Cancelled Fight card

Bellator 243 (Cancelled)

Bellator 243: Carmouche vs. Bohm was a scheduled event to take place on May 29, 2020 at Pechanga Resort and Casino in Temecula, California. The event was scheduled to be live on Paramount Network and DAZN.

Background

The event was expected to feature a women's flyweight bout between former UFC title contender Liz Carmouche and Mandy Bohm.

On March 30, Bellator announced that the event would be cancelled due to the COVID-19 pandemic in the United States.

Cancelled Fight card

Bellator 244 (Cancelled)

Bellator 244: Chandler vs. Henderson 2 was a scheduled event to take place on June 6, 2020 at Wintrust Arena in Chicago, Illinois. The event was scheduled to be live on DAZN.

Background

The event was expected to feature a rematch between former Bellator world champion Michael Chandler and former UFC and WEC world champion Benson Henderson, with Chandler having won the first bout.

Additionally, a semi-final matchup in the Bellator Featherweight World Grand Prix between former bantamweight champ Darrion Caldwell and A.J. McKee was scheduled for the card.

On April 21, Bellator announced that the event would be cancelled due to the COVID-19 pandemic in the United States.

Cancelled Fight card

Bellator 242

Bellator 242: Bandejas vs. Pettis took place on July 24, 2020 at the Mohegan Sun Arena in Uncasville, Connecticut.

The event aired live on Paramount Network and DAZN.

Bellator 242 marked the organization's return to live events following a shutdown due to the COVID-19 pandemic and was held behind closed doors without fans in attendance.

Results

Bellator 243

Chandler vs. Henderson 2 was initially scheduled to take place at Bellator 244 on June 6, 2020 at Wintrust Arena in Chicago, Illinois. However, the event was postponed due to the COVID-19 pandemic. It was announced that the bout was rescheduled as the main event of Bellator 243 set to take place on August 7 from the Mohegan Sun Arena in Uncasville, Connecticut.

The event aired live on Paramount Network and DAZN.

Background

The event featured a lightweight rematch between former three-time Bellator lightweight champion Michael Chandler and former WEC and UFC lightweight champion Benson Henderson. To set up for Bellator Lightweight Title contention.

Results

Bellator 244

Bader vs. Nemkov was initially scheduled to take place at Bellator 242 on May 9, 2020 at SAP Center in San Jose, California. However, the event was postponed due to the COVID-19 pandemic. It was announced that the bout was rescheduled as the main event for Bellator 244 set to take place on August 21 from the Mohegan Sun Arena in Uncasville, Connecticut.

The event aired live on Paramount Network and DAZN.

Background

The event featured a men's light heavyweight championship match between the current two-division champion Ryan Bader and the number one contender Vadim Nemkov.

Results

Bellator 245

Bellator 245: Davis vs. Machida II took place on September 11, 2020 at Mohegan Sun Arena in Uncasville, Connecticut.

Background

The event featured a light heavyweight bout between former Bellator Light Heavyweight World Champion Phil Davis and former UFC Light Heavyweight Champion Lyoto Machida. The two previously met at UFC 163 where Davis won by a controversial split decision.

Results

Bellator 246

Bellator 246: Archuleta vs. Mix took place on September 12, 2020 at Mohegan Sun Arena in Uncasville, Connecticut.

Background

The event featured a bout for the vacant Bellator Bantamweight World Championship between former featherweight title challenger Juan Archuleta and Patchy Mix.

At the weigh-ins, DeAnna Bennett and Keoni Diggs both missed weight for their respective bouts. Bennett weighed in at 131.7 pounds, 5.7 pounds over the non-title flyweight limit of 126.0 pounds, and Diggs weighed in at 157 pounds, 1 pound over the non-title lightweight limit of 156 pounds. Both bouts proceeded at catchweights and both fighters were fined a percentage of their respective purses, a percentage that went to their opponents.

This would be the last Bellator event to air on Paramount Network.

Results

Bellator Milan 2

Bellator Milan: Edwards vs. van Steenis was a mixed martial arts event scheduled for September 26, 2020 from Milan, Italy and marked the organization's eighth European Series event.

The event aired on Channel 5 in the United Kingdom and featured a middleweight bout between Fabian Edwards and Costello van Steenis.

Results

Bellator 247

Bellator 247: Jackson vs. Kielholtz was a mixed martial arts event held on October 1, 2020 from Milan, Italy.

Background

This was the first Bellator MMA event to air on CBS Sports Network.

The event was expected to feature a welterweight bout between Paul Daley and Derek Anderson. The day of the weigh-ins, Daley notified Bellator officials that he would not make weight. Daley weighed in anyway, 2.5 pounds over the welterweight weight limit of 171 lb. Daley was hospitalized and Bellator announced that the bout was canceled. The women's flyweight bout between Kate Jackson and Denise Kielholtz was bumped to the main event.

Results

Bellator Dublin 3 (Cancelled)

Bellator Dublin: Queally vs. Pitbull was supposed to take place on October 3, 2020 at 3Arena in Dublin, Ireland.

The event was cancelled by Bellator as they announced an event for October 1.

Background

The event was supposed feature a lightweight bout between Peter Queally and  Patricky Freire.

Cancelled Fight card

Bellator Milan 3

Bellator Milan: Gallagher vs. Ellenor took place on October 3, 2020 at Allianz Cloud in Milan, Italy as the ninth event in the Bellator European Series. The event will be live on Channel 5 in the UK.

Background

The event featured a bantamweight bout between rivals James Gallagher and Cal Ellenor.

Results

Bellator 248

Bellator Paris/Bellator 248 was a mixed martial arts event scheduled for October 10, 2020 from Paris, France. It was the first major MMA event held in France since the sport was legalized back in January.

Background

This was the first event where a leading MMA organization held a live event in front of a paying audience in France. One thousand tickets were made available and were all sold out within 48 hours.

The Bellator Paris portion of the card aired on Channel 5 and featured a heavyweight bout between former title challenger Cheick Kongo and Timothy Johnson. The two previously met at Bellator 208 where Kongo won by knockout the first round.

The Bellator 248 portion of the card aired on CBS Sports Network and featured a welterweight bout between Michael Page and former Cage Warriors Welterweight Champion Ross Houston. The bout was later updated to a 175-pound catchweight contest.

Results

Bellator 249

Bellator 249: Cyborg vs. Blencowe was a mixed martial arts event held on October 15, 2020 at the Mohegan Sun Arena in Uncasville, Connecticut. This event aired live on CBS Sports Network.

Background

The event featured a Bellator Women's Featherweight World Championship bout between the champion Cris Cyborg and former title challenger Arlene Blencowe.

A middleweight prelim bout between Curtis Millender and Joe Schilling was canceled after it was revealed by Schilling that one of his cornermen tested positive for COVID-19.

A catchweight bout between Patricky Freire and Jeleel Willis was scheduled to be the co-main event of the event. However, the bout was removed from the card when the Mohegan Tribal Athletic Commission deemed Freire unable to compete due to what was termed an undisclosed medical issue.

Results

Bellator 250

Bellator 250: Mousasi vs. Lima was a mixed martial arts event held on October 29, 2020 at the Mohegan Sun Arena in Uncasville, Connecticut. This event aired live on CBS Sports Network.

Background

The event featured a bout for the vacant Bellator Middleweight World Championship between current Bellator Welterweight World Champion Douglas Lima and former Bellator middleweight world champion Gegard Mousasi.

Nick Newell was scheduled to face Zachary Zane in a lightweight bout and Veta Arteaga was scheduled to Desiree Yanez in a women's flyweight bout. However, both bouts where cancelled when Newell and Arteaga tested positive for COVID-19.

Results

Bellator 251

Bellator 251: Manhoef vs. Anderson was a mixed martial arts event that took place on November 5, 2020 from the Mohegan Sun Arena in Uncasville, Connecticut. This event aired live on CBS Sports Network.

Background

The event featured a light heavyweight main event between Melvin Manhoef and UFC veteran Corey Anderson.

Results

Bellator 252

Bellator 252: Pitbull vs. Carvalho was a mixed martial arts event held on November 12, 2020 from the Mohegan Sun Arena in Uncasville, Connecticut. This event aired live on CBS Sports Network.

Background

The event featured a Bellator Featherweight World Grand Prix Quarter-Final bout for the Bellator Featherweight World Championship between the champion Patricio Freire and Pedro Carvalho. The bout was originally booked for Bellator 241, but the event was cancelled due to the COVID-19 pandemic.

Results

Bellator 253

Bellator 253: Caldwell vs. McKee was a mixed martial arts event scheduled for November 19, 2020 from the Mohegan Sun Arena in Uncasville, Connecticut. This event aired live on CBS Sports Network.

Background

The event featured a Bellator Featherweight World Grand Prix Semi-Final bout between Darrion Caldwell and A. J. McKee.

Results

Bellator 254

Bellator 254: Macfarlane vs. Velasquez was a mixed martial arts event held on December 10, 2020 from the Mohegan Sun Arena in Uncasville, Connecticut. This event aired live on CBS Sports Network.

Background

The event featured a Women's Flyweight main event for the Bellator Women's Flyweight World Championship between Ilima-Lei Macfarlane and Juliana Velasquez.

At weigh ins, Goiti Yamauchi weighed in at 162.8 pounds, 6.8 pounds over the lightweight limit. The bout against PFL veteran, Nate Andrews was cancelled. Mohegan Sun commission head, Mike Mazzulli, said that from now on Yamauchi will be required to fight at Welterweight, 170 pounds.

A women's featherweight bout between Marina Mokhnatkina and Jessica Borga was scheduled for this event but cancelled a week before for unknown reasons.

This would be the last card to air on CBS Sports Network; all Bellator cards will air exclusively on Showtime beginning in April 2021.

Results

See also
 List of current Bellator fighters

References

External links
Bellator

2020 in mixed martial arts
Bellator MMA events